Tom J. Morrissey (May, 1860 – September 23, 1941) was an American Major League Baseball player from Janesville, Wisconsin, who played third base for the  Detroit Wolverines of the National League, and the  Milwaukee Brewers of the Union Association.  In his 14 game Major League career, he batted 54 times, collected 10 hits for a .185 batting average.  In the field, he committed 11 errors for a .711 fielding percentage.  His brother John Morrissey also played Major League Baseball.

Morrissey died at the age of 81 in his hometown of Janesville, and is interred at Mount Olivet Cemetery.

References

External links

1860 births
1941 deaths
Major League Baseball third basemen
Baseball players from Wisconsin
19th-century baseball players
Detroit Wolverines players
Milwaukee Brewers (UA) players
Sportspeople from Janesville, Wisconsin
Bay City (minor league baseball) players
Milwaukee Brewers (minor league) players
Minneapolis Millers (baseball) players
Washington Nationals (minor league) players
Hartford Babies players
Oswego Starchboxes players
Eau Claire Lumbermen players
Milwaukee Cream Citys players
St. Paul Apostles players
Milwaukee Creams players
Sioux City Corn Huskers players
Oakland Colonels players
Marinette Badgers players
New Haven Nutmegs players
Dubuque (minor league baseball) players
Columbus Buckeyes (minor league) players
Columbus Senators players